Oberwinkleria is a fungal genus in the family Tilletiaceae. This is a monotypic genus, containing the single rust species Oberwinkleria anulata, found in Venezuela growing on the grass Ortachne erectifolia. The generic name honors German mycologist Franz Oberwinkler.

References

External links
 

Fungi of South America
Ustilaginomycotina
Monotypic Basidiomycota genera